Krupasindhu Bhoi (born 5 August 1942 Village Tampar  Sambalpur district (Orissa)) was member of 7th Lok Sabha from Sambalpur (Lok Sabha constituency) in Odisha state, India.

He was elected to 8th, 10th and 11th Lok Sabha from Sambalpur .

References

1942 births
India MPs 1980–1984
India MPs 1984–1989
India MPs 1991–1996
India MPs 1996–1997
People from Sambalpur district
Odisha politicians
Lok Sabha members from Odisha
Living people
Indian National Congress politicians
Indian National Congress politicians from Odisha